U.S. Country was a 24-hour music format produced by Jones Radio Networks. Its playlist is composed of mostly modern country music from artists such as Lonestar, Gretchen Wilson, Alan Jackson, Brooks & Dunn, Rascal Flatts and dozens more artists.

Jones Radio was recently purchased by Triton Media Group and was merge this satellite-driven feed into Dial Global's "Mainstream Country" network.

See also 
CD Country

Competitor networks 
Today's Best Country by ABC Radio Networks

Radio formats
Defunct radio networks in the United States
Defunct radio stations in the United States